The Boeing XP-15 was an American prototype monoplane fighter.

Design and development
This aircraft was essentially a monoplane version of the Boeing P-12, differing in having the lower wing omitted and in having all-metal construction as well as altered ailerons. The XP-15 had a split-axle undercarriage and a tail wheel.

Boeing numbered the craft as its Model 202; while the United States Army accepted it for testing and designated it as XP-15, they never actually purchased it, and it retained its civil registration of X-270V.

Operational history
The XP-15 first flew in January 1930, when it was discovered that the vertical stabilizer (a P-12C type) needed to be larger in order to compensate for the single wing. Initial testing showed a top speed to 178 mph, but with enlarged tail surfaces and a Townend cowling, it recorded 190 mph at 8,000 ft. The aircraft performed poorly, with a poor rate of climb and a high landing speed. The USAAC did not order the aircraft for production and on 7 February 1931, the prototype was destroyed when a propeller blade failed and the engine tore loose from its mounts.

The Navy was offered the similar Model 205. It first flew in February 1930. One was bought by the US Navy as the XF5B-1, but by the time flight testing was complete in 1932, other aircraft were ordered instead.

Variants
XP-15 1 built
XF5B-1 1 built

Operators

 United States Army Air Corps
 United States Navy

Specifications (XP-15)

See also

References

Notes

Bibliography

 Angelucci, Enzo. The American Fighter from 1917 to the present. New York: Orion Books, 1987.
 Jones, Lloyd S. U.S. Fighters, Army-Air Force: 1925 to 1980s. Fallbrook, California: Aero Publishers Incorporated, 1975,  pp. 48–49. .

External links

 XF5B-1

P-15
1930s United States fighter aircraft
Single-engined tractor aircraft
Parasol-wing aircraft
Carrier-based aircraft